Incilius nebulifer, also known as the coastal plains toad or Gulf coast toad, is a species of toad in the family Bufonidae. It is found on the coast of Gulf of Mexico from Veracruz in Mexico to Mississippi in the United States. It was removed from the synonymy of Incilius valliceps in 2000.
It occurs in a wide range of habitats, both natural and human-altered: coastal prairies, barrier beaches, towns, etc. Breeding takes place in various kinds of pools, including roadside and irrigation ditches. This widespread and common toad is not threatened.

Photos

References

nebulifer
Amphibians of Mexico
Amphibians of the United States
Amphibians described in 1854
Taxa named by Charles Frédéric Girard
Taxonomy articles created by Polbot